Disrepair is the second studio album by LUXT, released on March 18, 1997 by 21st Circuitry.

Reception

AllMusic awarded Disrepair three out of five possible stars. Aiding & Abetting gave the album a more mixed review, praising the production but criticizing the songwriting and musicianship. Black Monday credited the album with being as good as Jezebel Thirteen Three and called the music "well produced and executed, maintaining a tarnished membrane while shining all the brighter." Last Sigh Magazine called the band provocative and emotional, saying "their blend of hard-synth and dark elektro-gothik style is worth hearing over and over again when you feel in the mood for spine tingling aural sensations." Sonic Boom called the album an improvement over its predecessor and said "the engineering and mixing quality is superb and as such all the electronics, guitars, and vocals all flow smoothly together."

Track listing

Personnel
Adapted from the Disrepair liner notes.

LUXT
 Anna Christine – bass guitar, keyboards, sampler, vocals, arrangements, production, engineering
 Erie Loch – guitar, keyboards, sampler, vocals, arrangements, production, engineering

Production and design
 Steven Seibold – bass programming, arrangements, production, recording, engineering and remixing (15)

Release history

References

External links 
 

1997 albums
21st Circuitry albums
LUXT albums